John Lake Allen Arthur (7 April 1847 – 26 April 1877) was a first-class cricketer who played for Tasmania from 1866 to 1875.

He was an opening batsman and a roundarm bowler, which was the more common form of bowling at the time. Arthur represented Tasmania in three first-class matches, and a single game for a Rest of Australia side in 1872/73. Despite not normally playing as a wicket-keeper and never taking a single first-class catch, he effected one stumping keeping wicket in his first first-class match. In the same match in 1868–69 he captained the Tasmanian side, although the match was lost and Tasmania were bowled out for just 18 in the first innings.

He was invited to take part in the Australians' 1878 tour of England, but two days after receiving the letter of invitation he died suddenly in his hometown of Longford on 26 April 1877, aged 30 years and 19 days.

See also
 List of Tasmanian representative cricketers

References

External links
Cricinfo profile

1847 births
1877 deaths
Australian cricketers
Tasmania cricketers
Cricketers from Tasmania